Dis, DIS or variants may refer to:

Arts and entertainment

Music
 Dis (album), by Jan Garbarek, 1976
 Dís, a soundtrack album by Jóhann Jóhannsson, 2004
 "Dis", a song by The Gazette from the 2003 album Hankou Seimeibun
 "dis–", music from Mika Arisaka from the anime series Infinite Ryvius

Other uses in arts and entertainment
 DIS (collective), a collaborative art project, and their DIS Magazine
 Drowned in Sound (DiS), a British webzine 
 Dis – en historie om kjærlighet, or A Story About Love, a 1995 Norwegian film
 Dis, translated as In a Dark Wood, a 2006 Dutch novel by Marcel Möring

Businesses and organisations
 The Walt Disney Company, NYSE stock symbol DIS
 Daegu International School, in South Korea
 Dili International School, in East Timor
 Dubai International School, in the United Arab Emirates
 Dominican International School, in Taipei, Taiwan

Government and military
 Defence Intelligence Staff, a former British government agency
 Defence Industrial Strategy, a British government policy
 Defense Investigative Service, a former American government agency
 Digital and Intelligence Service, a service branch of the Singapore Armed Forces
  (Department of Information Security), an Italian intelligence agency
 Mikoyan-Gurevich DIS, a Soviet military plane

People
 Vladislav Petković Dis (1880–1917), Serbian poet
 Désiré Keteleer (1920–1970), or "Dis" Keteleer, a Belgian cyclist

Places
 Ad Dis, Yemen
 Ad Dis District

Religion and mythology
 Dīs Pater, a Roman god of the underworld
 Dis (Divine Comedy), a fictional city that contains the lower circles of hell
 Dís, female spirit or goddess associated with fate in Norse mythology

Science and technology
 Dis virtual machine, that executes Limbo code
 Draft International Standard, a stage in standardization process of the International Organization for Standardization
 Distributed Interactive Simulation, a standard for conducting wargaming across multiple computers
 DIS, a system with a dedicated, discrete graphics processing unit
 Deep inelastic scattering, a kind of scattering process in particle physics

Transportation
 Disneyland Resort station, Hong Kong, MTR station code DIS
 Dolisie Airport, Republic of the Congo, IATA airport code DIS

Other uses
 Diš (cuneiform), with various meanings
 Dis (skipper), a genus of butterflies
 Ampelodesmos mauritanicus, Maltese name for plant species

See also
 
 Diss (disambiguation)
 Diz Disley (1931–2010), Anglo-Canadian jazz guitarist and graphic designer